The Communist Party of Kurdistan (abbreviated KKP) is a political party in Turkey, founded in 1982 as the Kurdish branch of the Communist Labour Party of Turkey (TKEP). Between 1980 and 1982, the TKEP had a Kurdistan Autonomous Organization (Kürdistan Özerk Örgütü; KÖÖ). In 1990, the KKP became an independent party. The KKP is led by Mehmet Baran.

According to its party program, the KKP's goal is to establish a socialist People's Republic of Kurdistan. KKP members such as Sinan Çiftyürek have been among the founders of the Freedom and Socialism Party founded in 2011.

The main publication of the KKP is Dengê Kurdistan. The KKP also has a committee in Germany.

References

External links
Party news website

1982 establishments in Turkey
Communism in Kurdistan
Communist parties in Turkey
Far-left politics in Turkey
Kurdish nationalist political parties
Kurdish political parties in Turkey
Kurdish separatism in Turkey
National liberation movements
Organizations of the 1991 uprisings in Iraq
Political parties established in 1982